Jakob Bartholdy may refer to:

Jakob Salomon Bartholdy (1779–1825),  Prussian diplomat
Jakob Ludwig Felix Mendelssohn Bartholdy (1809–1847), German composer better known as Felix Mendelssohn, nephew of the above